February 5 - Eastern Orthodox liturgical calendar - February 7

All fixed commemorations below are observed on February 19 by Eastern Orthodox Churches on the Old Calendar.

For February 6, Orthodox Churches on the Old Calendar commemorate the Saints listed on January 24.

Feasts

 After feast of the Meeting of Our Lord.

Saints

 Venerable Bukolus, Bishop of Smyrna (c. 100)
 Martyrs Theophilus, Saturninus and Revocatus, in Spain (249-251)
 Virgin-martyr Dorothea, and with her Martyrs Christina and Callista, sisters, and Theophilus, at Caesarea in Cappadocia (288-300)
 Virgin-martyr Fausta, and with her Martyrs Evilasius and Maximus, at Cyzicus (305-311)
 Martyr Julian of Emesa the Physician, and Bishop Silvanus (312)
 Martyrs Faustus, Basil and Lucianus, of Darion in Constantinople, by the sword.
 Venerable John of Lycopolis (John of Thebes), monk (4th century)
 Saint James, ascetic, of Syria (c. 460)
 Saints Barsanuphius the Great and John the Prophet, monks of Gaza (6th century)
 Saint Photius the Great, Patriarch of Constantinople, Confessor and Equal-to-the-Apostles (891)
 Virgin-martyrs Martha and Mary and their brother Lycarion, at Tanis (Hermopolis) in Egypt.  (see also February 8 - Greek)

Pre-Schism Western saints

 Saint Antholian (Anatolianus), mentioned by St Gregory of Tours as one of the martyrs of Auvergne in France under Valerian and Gallienus (c. 265)
 Saint Mél of Ardagh (Mael), Bishop of Ardagh (488), disciple of St. Patrick.
 Saint Mun, a nephew of St Patrick who consecrated him bishop (5th century)
 Saint Vedast, Bishop of Arras (540)
 Saint Amandus of Elnone Abbey, Apostle of Maastricht (675)
 Saint Andrew of Elnone Abbey, a monk and disciple of St Amandus at Elnone in France, whom he succeeded as Abbot (c. 690)
 Saint Relindis of Maaseik (Renildis, Renula, Renule), Abbess of Maaseik in Belgium (c. 750)
 Saint Tanco of Werden (Tancho, Tatta), Abbot of Amalbarich Abbey in Saxony and eventually Bishop of Werden in Germany, martyred by pagans (808)

Post-Schism Orthodox saints

 Saint Arsenius of Iqalto, Georgia (1127)
 Hieromartyr Damaskinos (Tzagkaris) the Sinaite, martyred outside the walls of the monastery by the Mezenites (1623)
 Saint Dorothea, Schema-nun, of Kashin (1629)
 Hieromartyr Artemios the Sinaite (1822)

New martyrs and confessors

 New Hieromartyr Dimitry Rozhdestvensky, Archpriest, of Verny, and his son New Martyr Anatole (1922)
 New Hieromartyr Basil Nadezhnin, priest, of Moscow (1930)
 New Hieromartyr Alexander, Priest (1938)

Other commemorations

 Repose of Archbishop Theophan (Bystrov) of Poltava (1940)

Icon gallery

Notes

References

Sources
 February 6 / 19. Orthodox Calendar (Pravoslavie.ru).
 February 19 / 6. Holy Trinity Russian Orthodox Church (A parish of the Patriarchate of Moscow).
 February 6. OCA - The Lives of the Saints.
 The Autonomous Orthodox Metropolia of Western Europe and the Americas. St. Hilarion Calendar of Saints for the year of our Lord 2004. St. Hilarion Press (Austin, TX). p. 13.
 The Sixth Day of the Month of February. Orthodoxy in China.
 February 6. Latin Saints of the Orthodox Patriarchate of Rome.
 The Roman Martyrology. Transl. by the Archbishop of Baltimore. Last Edition, According to the Copy Printed at Rome in 1914. Revised Edition, with the Imprimatur of His Eminence Cardinal Gibbons. Baltimore: John Murphy Company, 1916. pp. 39–40.
 Rev. Richard Stanton. A Menology of England and Wales, or, Brief Memorials of the Ancient British and English Saints Arranged According to the Calendar, Together with the Martyrs of the 16th and 17th Centuries. London: Burns & Oates, 1892. p. 55.
Greek Sources
 Great Synaxaristes:  6 Φεβρουαρίου. Μεγασ Συναξαριστησ.
  Συναξαριστής. 6 Φεβρουαρίου. Ecclesia.gr. (H Εκκλησια Τησ Ελλαδοσ).
Russian Sources
  19 февраля (6 февраля). Православная Энциклопедия под редакцией Патриарха Московского и всея Руси Кирилла (электронная версия). (Orthodox Encyclopedia - Pravenc.ru).

February in the Eastern Orthodox calendar